Whitehorse Porter Creek West was a territorial electoral district in Yukon. Serving the city of Whitehorse, the district elected one member to the Yukon Legislative Assembly from 1978 to 1992.

Members

Election results

|-

| Progressive Conservative
| Doug Graham
| align="right"|188
| align="right"|
| align="right"|

| Liberal
| Clive Tanner
| align="right"|142
| align="right"|
| align="right"|

| NDP
| Kathy Horton
| align="right"|60
| align="right"|
| align="right"|
|-
! align=left colspan=3|Total
! align=right|
! align=right|
|}

|-

| Progressive Conservative
| Andy Philipsen
| align="right"|299
| align="right"|
| align="right"|

| NDP
| David Cosco
| align="right"|119
| align="right"|
| align="right"|

| Liberal
| Lawrence Whelan
| align="right"|45
| align="right"|
| align="right"|
|-
! align=left colspan=3|Total
! align=right|
! align=right|
|}

|-

| Progressive Conservative
| Andy Philipsen
| align="right"|393
| align="right"|
| align="right"|

| NDP
| Ross Priest
| align="right"|280
| align="right"|
| align="right"|

| Liberal
| Frances Nowasad
| align="right"| 99
| align="right"|
| align="right"|
|-
! align=left colspan=3|Total
! align=right|
! align=right|
|}

|-

| Progressive Conservative
| Alan Nordling
| align="right"|418
| align="right"|
| align="right"|

| NDP
| Ross Priest
| align="right"|311
| align="right"|
| align="right"|

| Liberal
| Derm O'Donovan
| align="right"|106
| align="right"|
| align="right"|
|-
! align=left colspan=3|Total
! align=right|
! align=right|
|}

|-

| Progressive Conservative
| Alan Nordling
| align="right"|651
| align="right"|
| align="right"|

| NDP
| John Wright
| align="right"|392
| align="right"|
| align="right"|

| Liberal
| Eldon Organ
| align="right"|55
| align="right"|
| align="right"|
|-
! align=left colspan=3|Total
! align=right|
! align=right|
|}

Former Yukon territorial electoral districts